Lindley Hoag Hadley (June 19, 1861 – November 1, 1948) was a U.S. Representative from Washington.

Born near Sylvania, Indiana, Hadley attended the common schools of his native city, Bloomingdale (Indiana) Academy, and Illinois Wesleyan University, Bloomington, Illinois.
He taught school in Rockville, Indiana from 1884 to 1889. He studied law. He was admitted to the bar in 1889. He moved to the State of Washington in 1890 and settled in Whatcom (now Bellingham), where he practiced law until elected to Congress.

Hadley was elected as a Republican to the Sixty-fourth and to the eight succeeding Congresses (March 4, 1915 – March 3, 1933). He was an unsuccessful candidate for reelection in 1932 to the Seventy-third Congress. Reengaged in the practice of law in Washington, D.C., until 1940, when he retired from active life and moved to Wilton, Connecticut. He died in Wallingford, Connecticut, November 1, 1948. He was interred in St. Matthew's Cemetery, Wilton, Connecticut.

Sources

External links

1861 births
1948 deaths
Illinois Wesleyan University alumni
People from Wallingford, Connecticut
Republican Party members of the United States House of Representatives from Washington (state)
People from Parke County, Indiana
People from Rockville, Indiana
Politicians from Bellingham, Washington